Villavieja may refer to:

 Villavieja, Huila, in the Huila Department, Colombia
 Villavieja del Lozoya, a municipality of the Community of Madrid, Spain
 Villavieja de Yeltes, a municipality in Salamanca, Castile and León, Spain
 Villa Vieja, a municipality and village in Santiago del Estero, Argentina